John Leatham (born 23 August 1946) is a former Australian rules footballer who played with Carlton in the Victorian Football League (VFL).

Notes

External links 

John Leatham's profile at Blueseum

1946 births
Carlton Football Club players
Australian rules footballers from Victoria (Australia)
Living people